Aquaspirillum bengal is a Gram negative bacterium in the genus Aquaspirillum.

Description
The species is helical in shape and moves in water through flagella. The cell is 0.9 to 1.2 μm in diameter and 5.2 to 22.0 μm in length.

References

Neisseriales
Bacteria described in 1974